Estevão Brioso de Figueiredo (1630–1689) was a Roman Catholic prelate who served as Bishop of Funchal (1683–1689) and the first Bishop of Olinda (1676–1683).

Biography
Estevão Brioso de Figueiredo was born in Évora, Portugal in 1630 and ordained a priest on 15 Jun 1658.
On 16 Nov 1676, he was appointed during the papacy of Pope Innocent XI as Bishop of Olinda.
On 21 Mar 1677, he was consecrated bishop by Luis de Sousa, Archbishop of Lisbon. 
On 27 Sep 1683, he was appointed during the papacy of Pope Innocent XI as Bishop of Funchal.
He served as Bishop of Funchal until his death on 20 May 1689.

Episcopal succession
While bishop, he was the principal co-consecrator of:
Gaspar Barata de Mendonça, Archbishop of São Salvador da Bahia (1677); and
José Antonio de Lencastre, Bishop of Miranda do Douro (1677).

References 

17th-century Roman Catholic bishops in Portugal
Bishops appointed by Pope Innocent XI
1630 births
1689 deaths
People from Évora
Roman Catholic bishops of Olinda e Recife